Northern School of Contemporary Dance (NSCD) is a higher education institution in Chapeltown, Leeds, England specialising in contemporary dance. Students can obtain undergraduate and postgraduate degrees in dance, validated by the University of Kent. A programme of adult, youth and children's classes is also available for the local community.

History and buildings
The school was founded in 1985 by Nadine Senior MBE and in 1987 it moved into its current premises, a red-brick former synagogue on Chapeltown Road built 1929–1932. The building is grade II listed as are the boundary walls, which probably date to about 1835.

Between 1987 and 1997, a series of phased developments were carried out which extended the site to include the adjacent Brandsby Lodge, also a grade II listed building. This £3.2 million redevelopment, which resulted in the creation of four new dance studios and additional teaching facilities, was completed with funding support from the National Lottery through the Arts Council of England and the Foundation for Sports and the Arts.

In 1988, the converted Synagogue re-opened its doors as The Dome Theatre and in 1993 was renamed The Riley Theatre in dedication to the memory of Jeffrey Riley, who was the School's Technical Director between 1985 and his untimely death in Kobe, Japan in 1993.

Founding Principal Nadine Senior MBE retired in 2001 and was replaced in 2002 by Gurmit Hukam. In 2012, Janet Smith left her position as Artistic Director of Scottish Dance Theatre to become Principal of the School. In 2020, Janet Smith MBE stepped down from her role, and was replaced with Sharon Watson MBE, formerly the longest-standing Artistic Director of Phoenix Dance Theatre in Leeds. In 2022, NSCD left the Conservatoire for Dance and Drama to become an independently registered Higher Education Institution.

Vocational training
NSCD offers full-time vocational training in contemporary dance at Certificate, Bachelors and Masters levels. The training includes classes influenced by the techniques of Cunningham and Graham, the more modern hybrid, evolved techniques and release based techniques as well as complementary training in ballet, yoga and fitness.

Centre for Advanced Training
In 2004, with funding support from the Department for Children, Schools & Families’ Music and Dance Scheme, NSCD and Northern Ballet came together to establish Yorkshire Young Dancers (YYD), the first national dance Centre for Advanced Training (CAT) in the UK. There are now a total of 10 dance CATs offering pre-vocational dance training to young people across the country.

See also
Listed buildings in Leeds (Chapel Allerton Ward)

References

External links

 
NSCD at Higher Education Degree Datacheck
 Review of showcase performance
CDD official website
 NSCD news release
 National Dance CATs official website

Educational institutions established in 1985
Performing arts education in the United Kingdom
Contemporary dance in the United Kingdom
Dance schools in the United Kingdom
1985 establishments in England
Education in Leeds
Listed buildings in Leeds
Grade II listed buildings in West Yorkshire
Grade II listed religious buildings and structures
Former synagogues in England
Leeds Blue Plaques